Anita Rossing-Brown (born 13 October 1960) is a Swedish former diver. She competed at the 1984 Summer Olympics and the 1988 Summer Olympics.

References

External links
 

1960 births
Living people
Swedish female divers
Olympic divers of Sweden
Divers at the 1984 Summer Olympics
Divers at the 1988 Summer Olympics
Divers from Gothenburg
20th-century Swedish women
21st-century Swedish women